Brian Goodhart (5 April 1913 – 28 August 2003) was an  Australian rules footballer who played with Fitzroy in the Victorian Football League (VFL).

Notes

External links 
		

1913 births
2003 deaths
Australian rules footballers from New South Wales
Fitzroy Football Club players
North Broken Hill Football Club players